The Impeccable Mr. Wilson is a studio album by American jazz pianist Teddy Wilson featuring performances recorded in 1956 for the Norgran label.

Reception
Allmusic awarded the album 3 stars.

Track listing
 "I Want to Be Happy" (Vincent Youmans, Irving Caesar ) - 3:00
 "Ain't Misbehavin'" (Fats Waller, Harry Brooks, Andy Razaf) - 3:00
 "Honeysuckle Rose" (Waller, Razaf) - 3:00
 "Fine and Dandy" (Kay Swift, Paul James) - 3:34
 "Sweet Lorraine" (Cliff Burwell, Mitchell Parish) - 3:00
 "I've Found a New Baby" (Jack Palmer, Spencer Williams) - 3:37
 "It's the Talk of the Town" (Jerry Livingston, Al J. Neiburg, Marty Symes) - 3:00
 "Laura" (David Raksin, Johnny Mercer) - 3:33
 "Undecided" (Sid Robin, Charlie Shavers) - 4:12
 "Time on My Hands" (Youmans, Harold Adamson, Mack Gordon) - 3:00
 "Who Cares?" (George Gershwin, Ira Gershwin) - 3:29
 "Love Is Here to Stay" (Gershwin, Gershwin) - 3:00

Personnel
Teddy Wilson - piano 
Al Lucas – bass
Jo Jones - drums

References

Verve Records albums
Teddy Wilson albums
1957 albums
Albums produced by Norman Granz